Arnold is a 1973 American horror comedy film directed by Georg Fenady and starring Stella Stevens, Roddy McDowall, Elsa Lanchester, Shani Wallis, Farley Granger, Victor Buono, John McGiver, Bernard Fox, Patric Knowles, Jamie Farr and Norman Stuart. The film was released by Cinerama Releasing Corporation on November 16, 1973.

Plot
Lord Arnold Dwellyn (Norman Stuart) and his lover Karen (Stella Stevens) have just been married. However, this is no ordinary marriage ... because Arnold is a recent corpse. There are also interesting conditions: Arnold is not to be buried but remain in the family mansion and Karen, in order to inherit his estate, must remain by him in the mansion permanently. Not everyone is pleased by this arrangement, including Arnold's wastrel younger brother Robert (Roddy McDowall) (with whom Karen has been having a secret affair), his widow Lady Jocelyn (Shani Wallis) and his solicitor cousin Douglas Whitehead (Patric Knowles); in fact, the only one who is happy with the situation is Arnold's sister Hester (Elsa Lanchester). When everybody starts trying to find ways of breaking Arnold's will and trying to find a huge sum of cash hidden somewhere on the family estate, mysterious deathtraps, apparently planned by Arnold well in advance of his death and tailored to each of the victims, begin dealing with the greedy claimants ... and all this while the local constable (Bernard Fox) is investigating the mysterious deaths in a less than effective manner.

Cast
Stella Stevens as Karen 
Roddy McDowall as Robert
Elsa Lanchester as Hester
Shani Wallis as Lady Jocelyn Dwellyn
Farley Granger as Evan Lyons
Victor Buono as Minister
John McGiver as Governor
Bernard Fox as Constable Hooke
Patric Knowles as Douglas Whitehead
Jamie Farr as Dybbi
Norman Stuart as Lord Arnold Dwellyn
Ben Wright as Jonesy
Wanda Bailey as Flo
Steven Marlo as 1st Dart Player
Leslie Thompson as 2nd Dart Player
Murray Matheson as Lord Arnold Dwellyn (voice) (uncredited)

References

External links
 
 

1973 horror films
1970s comedy horror films
1970s mystery films
1973 films
American comedy horror films
American mystery films
Cinerama Releasing Corporation films
Films set in country houses
1973 comedy films
1970s English-language films
Films directed by Georg Fenady
1970s American films